Shamsabad (also Romanized as Shamsābād) is a village in Alvandkuh-e Sharqi Rural District, in the Central District of Hamadan County, Hamadan Province, Iran. At the 2006 census, its population was 101, in 29 families.

References 

Populated places in Hamadan County